Glockoma 2 is the third studio album by American rapper Key Glock. It was released on February 24, 2023, through Paper Route Empire. The album peaked at number 13 on the US Billboard 200.

Background and promotion
The album serves as the sequel to Key Glock's 2018 mixtape Glockoma. According to producer Bandplay, most of the album was recorded during the European leg of Key Glock's summer 2022 tour.

On December 7, 2022, Key Glock announced a supporting tour for the album, which included dates from March 5 to April 28, 2023. Three days prior to the album's release, Key Glock revealed the album's track listing on social media.

Singles
The album's lead single, "From Nothing", was released on August 17, 2022. The album's second single, "Work", was released on February 17, 2023. The album's third single, "Dirt", was released on February 22, 2023.

Critical reception

Reviewing for AllMusic, Paul Simpson wrote, "[Glockoma 2] finds the Memphis rapper as determined and driven as ever. Acknowledging the loss of his close friend, cousin, and collaborator Young Dolph, he remains inspired to continue working on music at a productive pace. Eric Diep of HipHopDX wrote, "While Glock's sequel tape doesn't quite capture the spontaneous energy of his breakout predecessors, there's plenty of flex raps, pimp energy and Memphis rap signatures to get Huey's and Gus's jumping."

Track listing

Charts

References

2023 albums
Empire Distribution albums
Key Glock albums